The following elections occurred in the year 1877.

Africa
 1877 Liberian general election

Europe
 1877 Dutch general election
 1877 French legislative election
 1877 German federal election

North America

Mexico
 1877 Mexico extraordinary presidential election

United States
 1877 New York state election

See also
 :Category:1877 elections

1877
Elections